Manlius Valerius Thomson (August 12, 1802 – July 22, 1850) was a lawyer and politician from the U.S. state of Kentucky. From 1840 to 1844, he served as the 12th Lieutenant Governor of Kentucky serving under Governor Robert P. Letcher.

Thomson was born in Scott County, Kentucky and studied in the common schools.  He further earned his A.B. from Transylvania University in 1822.  He was a state senator for two terms, and he was elected the 11th Lieutenant Governor of Kentucky over John L. Helm by a vote of 52,423 to 35,890.  Following the completion of this term as Lieutenant Governor, he was appointed in 1847 by Governor William Owsley as Colonel of the Third Kentucky Regiment during the Mexican War.  In 1850 he died of cholera at his home in Georgetown, Kentucky

External links
http://archiver.rootsweb.com/th/read/George-Sterling-Smith/2004-12/1103239124-01
http://politicalgraveyard.com/bio/thomson.html

Lieutenant Governors of Kentucky
Kentucky state senators
1850 deaths
1802 births
Transylvania University alumni
People from Scott County, Kentucky
Deaths from cholera
Infectious disease deaths in Kentucky
19th-century American politicians